The 2010–11 Czech Extraliga season was the 18th season of the Czech Extraliga since its creation after the breakup of Czechoslovakia and the Czechoslovak First Ice Hockey League in 1993. In the regular season, HC Oceláři Třinec finished atop the league.

Standings

Playoffs

Relegation

External links 

 

2010-11
Czech
1